Margaret Kampschaefer Butler (March 27, 1924 – March 8, 2013) was a mathematician who participated in creating and updating computer software. During the early 1950s, Butler contributed to the development of early computers. Butler was the first female fellow at the American Nuclear Society and director of the National Energy Software Center at Argonne. Butler held leadership positions within multiple scientific organizations and women's groups. She was the creator and director of the National Energy Software Center. Here, Butler operated an exchange for the editing of computer programs in regards to nuclear power and developed early principles for computer technology.

Early life and education
Butler was born on March 27, 1924, in Evansville, Indiana. She studied statistics and differential calculus at Indiana University and graduated in 1944.

Career
Butler began her career in 1944 working as a statistician at the Bureau of Labor Statistics. While she worked there, she also taught math at the United States Department of Agriculture Graduate School and took graduate courses related to sampling theory. About a year later, she joined the United States Army Air Forces and worked as a civilian in Germany. She returned to the United States after two years and began working in the Naval Reactors Division of Argonne National Laboratory as a junior mathematician. While working at Argonne, Butler made calculations for physicists creating a prototype for a submarine reactor and attended atomic physics and reactor design classes. In 1949, she worked at the Bureau of Labor Statistics in Minnesota but returned to Argonne National Laboratory in 1951. Following her return to Argonne, Butler became an assistant mathematician in the Reactor Engineering Division and worked on AVIDAC, an early computer. In the 1950s she wrote software, reactor applications, mathematical subroutines, and utilities for three other Argonne computers, the ORACLE, GEORGE, and UNIVAC.

Butler led Argonne's Applied Mathematics Division's Application Programming from 1959 to 1965. While working in this department, she developed teams to fix program problems in reactors, biology, chemistry, physics, management, and high energy physics applications. In 1960, she worked with others to establish the Argonne Code Center, which later became the National Energy Software Center (NESC). Butler would later become director of the NESC from 1972–1991. She became the first woman to be named fellow of the American Nuclear Society in 1972, following her nomination a year earlier. She was also a consultant to the European Nuclear Energy Agency during the time it was establishing its computer program.

In 1980, Butler was promoted to Senior Computer Scientist at Argonne. She officially retired in 1991, but continued to work at Argonne from 1993 to 2006 as a "special term appointee".

Impact
During her time in Argonne, Butler was very supportive of her female coworkers. Women working at Argonne described her as a role model with a welcoming presence. According to her son Jay, she thought women were "given all the responsibilities and none of the authorities" and had to work "harder and smarter" yet were still not treated as individuals. When Butler rose in the ranks at Argonne, she made sure to hire women and recommend them for promotions. She worked with other women to organize an Association for Women in Science in Chicago. While in AWIS, she held executive board positions and led two conferences for high school students, teachers, and administration.

The Argonne Leadership Computing Facility established the Margaret Butler Fellowship in Computational Science, a postdoctoral fellowship in her honor.

References

1924 births
2013 deaths
American women mathematicians
Women statisticians
American women computer scientists
American computer scientists
People from Evansville, Indiana
Indiana University alumni
20th-century American mathematicians
21st-century American mathematicians
Argonne National Laboratory people
20th-century women mathematicians
21st-century women mathematicians
American statisticians
20th-century American women
21st-century American women
United States Army Air Forces civilians
United States Army women civilians